Heterusia atalantata is a species of geometrid moth in the family Geometridae. It is found in Central America, North America, and South America.

The MONA or Hodges number for Heterusia atalantata is 7367.

References

Further reading

 
 

Stamnodini
Articles created by Qbugbot
Moths described in 1858